Dusty Blake (born April 26, 1982) is an American professional baseball coach who is the pitching coach for the St. Louis Cardinals of Major League Baseball (MLB).

Blake is from Candor, North Carolina. He enrolled at Appalachian State University and played college baseball for the Appalachian State Mountaineers. He earned his bachelor's degree and master's degree from Appalachian State. He became a pitching coach for Catawba College from 2006 to 2007, Wofford College from 2008 to 2011, and University of South Carolina Upstate in 2012. Blake was hired as the head coach for Pfeiffer University for the 2013 season. He coached at Pfeffer from 2013 to 2017, and then was the pitching coach at Duke University from 2018 to 2020. In 2020, pitcher Bryce Jarvis became the highest-drafted player in Duke Blue Devils history.

In 2021, the Cardinals hired Blake as their pitching strategist. They promoted him to pitching coach after the 2022 season.

References

Living people
People from Montgomery County, North Carolina
Appalachian State Mountaineers baseball players
Catawba Indians baseball coaches
Wofford Terriers baseball coaches
USC Upstate Spartans baseball coaches
Pfeiffer Falcons baseball coaches
Duke Blue Devils baseball coaches
St. Louis Cardinals coaches
Major League Baseball pitching coaches
1982 births